Craig S. Walls (born December 24, 1958) in Pittsburgh, Pennsylvania is a former American football offensive lineman/defensive lineman in the Arena Football League. He also played linebacker in the United States Football League and the National Football League. He played college football at Indiana University.

In 1998, Walls was elected into the Arena Football Hall of Fame.

College career
Walls attended Indiana University in Bloomington, Indiana, where he lettered a member of the football team from 1979 to 1981. Walls helped lead the Hoosiers to the 1979 Holiday Bowl. At the time of his graduation, Walls was the 3rd leading tackler in Indiana history with 342.

References

1958 births
Living people
American football linebackers
Indiana Hoosiers football players
Denver Gold players
Ottawa Rough Riders players
Pittsburgh Gladiators players
Buffalo Bills players